The Saudi Air Ambulance service, started in 2009, is run by the Saudi Red Crescent Authority (SRCA), as part of its provision of emergency medical services in Saudi Arabia. The fleet includes helicopters and fixed-wing aircraft. The service is used for domestic and international intensive care units.

History
The SRCA launched the service in December 2009, with an initial fleet of six MD Explorer helicopters, based in Riyadh Province and operated by Action Aviation, a British company. An Airbus ACJ318 Elite jet was added the same month.

Coverage

The Air Ambulance service has a particular role to play during the Hajj (the annual pilgrimage of Muslims to Mecca), providing on-the-spot first aid to take emergency cases to the nearest medical facilities. For the 2018 pilgrimage season it had prepared eight aircraft for purposes of evacuation.

In July 2016 the Saudi Electric Company (SEC) completed the construction of airstrips for air ambulances at its power plants. It had worked with the SRCA to provide quick medical services to company plant authorities, especially those far from hospitals.

The Air Ambulance service Market 
The Kingdom of Saudi Arabia air ambulance market size was estimated at US$60.2 million in 2016 and US$78.51 million in 2019, It is expected to reach US$85.67 million in 2020.

Fleet

The Saudi Air Ambulance fleet consists of the following aircraft:

See also

 Air ambulance
 Medical escort
 Medical evacuation

References

External links

 Saudi Red Crescent Authority website
 Saudi General Authority Of Civil Aviation (GACA) website (English version)
 Saudi Air Ambulance Helicopters photos 
 MD902
 More info about Air Ambulance at the beginning

Air ambulance services